Simon Rubinstein may refer to:

Simon Rubinstein (chess player) (c. 1910–1942), Austrian chess master
Simon Rubinstein (pimp) (c. 1880–1965), Argentine businessman and pimp